Elkhorn Public Schools is a school district headquartered in Elkhorn, Omaha, Nebraska.

History

In 2006 a $96 million bond referendum was given to the voters.

In 2014 a $63.1 million bond was approved by voters.

Steve Baker served as the superintendent from 2008 until his June 30, 2017 retirement. During his period the number of students increased by 75%. Bary Habrock began as superintendent on July 1, 2017.

In 2017 the district had 8,386 students.

In 2018 the district put a $149.6 bond up for a referendum to the district's voters.

In August 2021, construction of Elkhorn North Ridge Middle School was completed and they began their first year.

Schools
 High schools
 Elkhorn High School
 Elkhorn North High School
 Elkhorn South High School

 Middle schools
 Elkhorn Middle School
 Elkhorn Grandview Middle School
 Elkhorn Ridge Middle School
 Elkhorn Valley View Middle School
 Elkhorn North Ridge Middle School

 Elementary schools
 Arbor View Elementary School - Opened in fall 2016, financed by a bond worth $63.1 million that was issued in 2014
 Blue Sage Elementary School
 Fire Ridge Elementary School
 Hillrise Elementary School
 Manchester Elementary School
 Sagewood Elementary School
 Skyline Elementary School
 Spring Ridge Elementary School
 West Bay Elementary School
 West Dodge Station Elementary School
 Westridge Elementary School
 Woodbrook Elementary School

References

External links
 Elkhorn Public Schools
 Elkhorn Public Schools Foundation

School districts in Nebraska
Education in Omaha, Nebraska